Steve Lambke is a Canadian singer-songwriter. He is a vocalist and guitarist for the indie rock band Constantines, and formerly released solo material under the name Baby Eagle.

Biography
Lambke grew up in Cambridge, Ontario where he played with fellow Constantine Dallas Wehrle in a band called Captain Co-Pilot in the late 1990s. He moved to Guelph in 1997 to attend school at the University of Guelph and earned a Bachelor of Science in physics. Lambke and Wehrle joined two former members of Shoulder in 1999 to form the Constantines.

Lambke released his first solo album, Baby Eagle, in 2006 on Outside Music. The album was recorded in Winnipeg, MB, and includes contributions from John K. Samson and Christine Fellows. A second album, No Blues, was recorded in Sackville, NB, with contributions from Julie Doiron and Shotgun & Jaybird, and was released in 2007 on Outside Music. The album, Dog Weather was released in 2010 on Lambke's own You've Changed Records and received strong reviews all around. The album includes collaborations with Daniel Romano of Attack in Black, Shotgun Jimmie as well as David Trenaman and Colleen Collins of Construction & Destruction.

The album Bone Soldiers was released by You've Changed Records on March 6, 2012. The album is credited to Baby Eagle and the Proud Mothers, and has a noisier, more punk-influenced sound than previous recordings. The Proud Mothers are Lambke's fellow Constantine Will Kidman, Ian Kehoe, Spencer Burton and Nick Ferrio.

Lambke currently lives in Toronto, where he continues to write, record and perform. He co-owns and operates You've Changed Records along with Daniel Romano.

He was a nominee for the 2013 SOCAN Songwriting Prize for "Mule in the Flowers", a song he cowrote with Tamara Lindeman of The Weather Station.

Discography
Baby Eagle (2006)
No Blues (2007)
Dog Weather (2010)
Bone Soldiers (2012)
Days of Heaven (2015)
Dark Blue (2019)

With Daniel Romano as Spider Bite 
Spider Bite (2020)

References

External links

Constantines official website
http://youvechangedrecords.com

Year of birth missing (living people)
Living people
People from Cambridge, Ontario
Canadian rock singers
Canadian rock guitarists
Canadian male guitarists
Canadian singer-songwriters
Canadian indie rock musicians
Musicians from Ontario
Canadian male singer-songwriters